Pennsylvania State Senate District 42 includes part of Allegheny County. It is currently represented by Democrat Wayne D. Fontana.

District profile
The district includes the following areas:

Allegheny County:

Senators

References

Government of Allegheny County, Pennsylvania
Pennsylvania Senate districts